The 1999 Austrian Grand Prix was a Formula One motor race held on 25 July 1999 at the A1-Ring in Spielberg, Austria. It was the ninth race of the 1999 Formula One season.

After Michael Schumacher broke his leg in the previous race at Silverstone, Ferrari's title attention turned to his teammate Eddie Irvine. David Coulthard nudged teammate Mika Häkkinen off the track on the first lap, pushing Häkkinen to the back. When Coulthard failed to hold off Irvine during the sole round of pitstops, the man from Northern Ireland wrapped up his 2nd Formula One win. Häkkinen fought through the field to finish 3rd. It was Ferrari's first win in Austria since 1970. Mika Salo substituted for Schumacher, while Pedro Diniz scored his last world championship points at this race.

Classification

Qualifying

Race

Championship standings after the race

Drivers'  Championship standings

Constructors'   Championship standings

 Note: Only the top five positions are included for both sets of standings.

References

 

Austrian
1999
Grand Prix
Austrian Grand Prix